The Chatham Main Line is a railway line in England that links London Victoria and Dover Priory / Ramsgate, travelling via Medway (of which the town of Chatham is part, hence the name).

Services to Cannon Street follow the route as far as St Mary Cray Junction where they diverge onto the South Eastern Main Line near Chislehurst.

Thameslink services to Luton run in parallel from Rainham to Rochester, diverging once across the River Medway at Rochester Bridge Junction onto the North Kent Line via Gravesend and Dartford.

A shuttle service operates on the Sheerness Line which starts at Sittingbourne.

Services 
Most services on the Line are run by SE Trains and Southern.

There is an hourly service from Victoria calling at  via the Catford Loop,  then all stations to Gillingham. A service operates in the opposite direction.

Rolling stock 
The following trains are operated on the line : Class 465 "Networker" since 1992, Class 466 "Networker" since 1993, Class 375 "Electrostar" since 2001, Class 395 "Javelin" since 2009, and 8-car Class 700 "Desiro City" since 2018.

History 
The line was built by the London, Chatham and Dover Railway, who were in competition with the South Eastern Railway (hence the duplication of stations in Kent). They subsequently built lines to Sevenoaks and Ashford (via Maidstone) from the Chatham Main Line.

The line was electrified (750 V DC third rail) in a series of stages. Initially the new Southern Railway electrified the urban (within London) workings of the SECR in the 1920s. In July 1925 "South Eastern Electrification (Stage 1)" saw the line from Victoria to junction with the South Eastern Main Line at Bickley, including the Catford Loop Line electrified. This was extended to outer suburban workings to Sevenoaks via Swanley (Bickley junction to Swanley) in two stages, reaching St Mary Cray in May 1934 and Swanley in January 1935. Full outer suburban electrification was achieved with the "Maidstone & Gillingham Electrification" scheme in July 1939, extending electrification from Swanley to Gillingham. Post war, under the BR's 1955 Modernisation plan, electrification was completed (Gillingham to Ramsgate and Dover) under "Kent Coast Electrification" stage 1 in 1959. At the same time the four track section between Shortlands and St Mary Cray junction was extended to Swanley Junction with a complete rebuilding of the St Mary Cray Junction. Two passing loops were added (to create a four-track section) between Rainham and Newington.

A short branch was built during World War One to service the construction of RAF Manston with a junction off the up line at Birchington on Sea.

Eurostar
Heading away from Victoria, between Farningham Road and Longfield Stations, the line which was originally used by Eurostar trains travelling from Waterloo International towards Fawkham Junction to access High Speed 1 still exists, but is currently not in use. 

At one time this line was reserved for emergency use only by Class 395 Javelins travelling to/from Ashford International but, as the route knowledge has not been updated, no trains run on this line any more. 

The Eurostar trains can no longer use this line as the Class 373 "Eurostar e300" trains had their 750V DC third rail shoes removed in 2007, whilst the new Class 374 "Eurostar e320" trains are not fitted with third rail equipment.

East Kent re-signalling project 
The idea of this project is for control of East Kent from Longfield to Ramsgate and just short of Dover Priory to be under the control of the East Kent Signalling Centre (EKSC) based at Gillingham.

Phase 1 of the project was carried out over the Christmas and New Year period of 2011, which involved the complete re-signalling from just east of Sittingbourne to Faversham, then on to Minster Junction and Buckland Junction, just short of Dover Priory. The old signal boxes were then abolished at Faversham, Margate, Ramsgate, Canterbury East and Shepherdswell.
Phase 2 involved the re-signalling of the line between Sittingbourne to Longfield and Strood, including the Sheerness Branch Line and the Medway Valley Line to operate from the East Kent Signalling Centre at Gillingham, which is now operational. This means that the Signal Boxes at Rainham and Rochester have now closed, although Sittingbourne remains open as a relay signal box for the Sheerness Branch Line, controlled from Gillingham.

On 13 December 2015, a new £26M Rochester station on Corporation Street opened 500 m west of the original station which it replaced. This station has three platforms and can accommodate 12-car trains instead of the 10-cars maximum length at the original station. Some 12-car peak-time trains are additionally stopping here. At the time, only platforms 1 and 2 were operational. From Easter 2016, Platform 3 was only a Bay Platform with a maximum length of eight cars, but since 10 October 2016, Platform 3 became a through platform with services either able to head towards the Kent Coast or terminating here before head back up towards London. At the East End of the platform, a third line now runs all the way up to the old Rochester Station passing through what was Platform 4 before rejoining the Down Main towards Chatham. This can also enable long freight trains to be held here, allowing passenger services to pass, therefore removing a potential bottleneck.

Rainham has a new bay platform off the up-line, which can accommodate a 12-car train, labelled Platform 0. It was being used temporarily as a Terminus for a couple of evening rush hour trains, but since the introduction of the new Thameslink Metro timetable in 2018, this is now the terminus for services to Luton via Gravesend, Dartford, Woolwich Arsenal and Greenwich, stopping at all but a few stations to London Bridge.

Strood has also been lengthened to accommodate 12-car trains.

Accidents and incidents 
The line was closed until 13 September.

See also 
 South Eastern Main Line

References

External links 

Rail transport in Kent
Transport in the London Borough of Bromley
Transport in the London Borough of Lambeth
Transport in Medway
Transport in the London Borough of Southwark
Transport in the London Borough of Wandsworth
Railway lines in London
Railway lines in South East England
Standard gauge railways in England